"Ghost Town" is a song by American rapper Kanye West from his eighth studio album, Ye (2018). The song features vocals from PartyNextDoor, Kid Cudi, and 070 Shake. It was produced by West, while co-produced by Mike Dean, and features additional production from Francis and the Lights, Benny Blanco and Noah Goldstein. The song is a hip hop track, which features psychedelic elements. It is composed around a sample of "Take Me for a Little While", performed by the Royal Jesters, and also includes a sample of "Someday", performed by Shirley Ann Lee.

The mind of West is demonstrated as going through the unravelling process within "Ghost Town", which is connected to mental illness, and West's verse features him gargling unfinished thoughts. The song received generally strong reviews from music critics and was mostly named by them as one of the album's highlights, with general praise from critics going towards 070 Shake's outro. A number of them complimented the lush composition of the song, though other critics expressed somewhat mixed assessments of West's verse. The song was included in end of the year lists for 2018 by multiple publications, including Consequence of Sound and NME.

"Ghost Town" reached number 16 on the US Billboard Hot 100 in 2018, while also peaking at number 14 and 17 on the NZ Singles Chart and UK Singles Chart, respectively. The song has since been certified 2× platinum in the United States by the Recording Industry Association of America (RIAA). West and Kid Cudi have delivered multiple joint performances of the song, including performing it on Saturday Night Live and at the Coachella Music Festival in 2018 and 2019, respectively. The song was covered by both BadBadNotGood and Jungle in 2018. A sequel to the song was released by West and Kid Cudi, as Kids See Ghosts, under the title of "Freeee (Ghost Town, Pt. 2)" on their eponymous debut studio album (2018). The sequel features an interpolation of lyrics from the song.

Background and development

A link was shared by West via his blog on February 7, 2009 to a cover version of his 2007 single "Can't Tell Me Nothing" by American pop project Francis and the Lights. They first collaborated on the latter's single "Friends" in 2016 alongside Bon Iver, and West has a cameo in the accompanying music video. Along with "Ghost Town", Francis and the Lights contributed production to Ye tracks "I Thought About Killing You" and "All Mine". He handled additional production for the former of the three, alongside Benny Blanco and Noah Goldstein, while Mike Dean co-produced it and West served as the lead producer.

In a November 2016 interview with NOW Magazine, Canadian musician PartyNextDoor cited West as whom he wanted to produce and write at the level of, while also stating that he was influenced by West when he was younger. Following the release of his third EP Colours 2 in June 2017, PartyNextDoor tweeted on July 20 of that year that he had new music on the way with West and Apple Music simultaneously responded via Twitter. At the time, it was unknown what project West and PartyNextDoor were recording for and the two had never collaborated in the past. PartyNextDoor later tweeted a picture of the two of them talking on July 22, 2017, the first photographic evidence of their collaboration. Alongside "Ghost Town", PartyNextDoor provided vocals and songwriting for Ye track "Wouldn't Leave", though he wasn't properly credited until the album's credits were updated on streaming services on June 15, 2018.

Initially an unknown SoundCloud user, American hip hop artist 070 Shake refused to sign with anyone other than West. 070 Shake ultimately signed to his record label GOOD Music in 2016 and recalled West advising her "to ultimately be 100 percent open when you're creating and let your mind wander," as well as to not "set any boundaries for yourself." The song and fellow album track "Violent Crimes" both include vocals from 070 Shake. In an interview with Rolling Stone, she stated that after the song, a lot of people were contacting her by phone, and recalled being "like, 'How did you get my number?' and shit." Of listening to the song for the first time, 070 Shake labeled the feeling "surreal" and said she placed focus on taking the whole moment in so she would not have regretted failing to take it in properly after the time, while 070 Shake opined that being on a record with West felt "crazy".

A promotional video was displayed on West's official website from the Ye listening party that was set to "Ghost Town" and "I Thought About Killing You", though the website was ultimately updated on October 22, 2019. West assembled the listening party on the night before the album's release in Jackson Hole, Wyoming, which is the same place that it was recorded by him. Kevin Parker of Tame Impala initially believed that he was credited as a co-writer on the song instead of "Violent Crimes", until he was informed that the latter was played at the listening party. Parker had allegedly sent a number samples to West for Ye, but assumed that they hadn't made the cut after not hearing back from him. West began to come to Jackson Hole often from early 2017 onwards, months after his stay in hospital. After he left the hospital, notes were made by West about his experiences and feelings. As part of the album's songwriting process, West gave his notes to various writers for them to help add structure to his thoughts. When discussing his songwriting process during an interview with The New York Times on June 25, 2018, West revealed that co-writer Malik Yusef was responsible for the lyrics "Sometimes I take all the shine/Talk like I drank all the wine." Before combining rap with rock, West and Kid Cudi had shown admiration to rock artists.

Composition and lyrics

Musically, "Ghost Town" is a hip hop track, which was often noted for its rock elements. The song includes a sample of "Take Me for a Little While", written by Trade Martin, and performed by the Royal Jesters, within its leading bass, drum and keys combination. The opening of the track features a sample of "Someday", as performed by Shirley Ann Lee. Guitars are included within the song, which some writers viewed as psychedelic. In particular, "Ghost Town" has been noted for taking rock influence from Kid Cudi's work, with a "strong presence of guitars" that Will Lavin of Joe.co.uk called "very reminiscent of a couple of tracks" from his second studio album Man on the Moon II: The Legend of Mr. Rager (2010). The Atlantics Spencer Kornhaber commented that the song features "psychedelic, space-soul, and prog sounds." West's tone is dazed, with him using the same verse melody as that of his Pusha T-featuring single "Runaway" (2010). In the outro, laser sounds are featured.

The song presents the mind of West going through the process of unravelling, with the ongoing speculation around his mental health often being poor. Mental illness is a common theme on Ye; the song is linked to the subject matter of the album that West's mind is unravelling. PartyNextDoor sings about feeling so good that it is dangerous. West's verse on the song sees him gargling multiple half-finished thoughts, as he opens up his mind. The lyrics of West's verse include a reference to the opioid painkiller fentanyl from him. While singing the chorus of "Ghost Town", Kid Cudi interpolates vocals from rock and roll artist Dave Edmunds' 1979 version of "Take Me for a Little While". The outro is performed by 070 Shake, featuring her singing about freedom and numbness in a manner that has been described as belting. 070 Shake explained that she used a metaphor for numbness with the line, "Put my hand on the stove, to see if I still bleed."

Release and recording
"Ghost Town" was released on June 1, 2018 as the sixth and penultimate track on West's eighth studio album Ye. However, West had tweeted out an early track list of the eponymous debut studio album by Kids See Ghosts, a hip hop duo consisting of him and Kid Cudi, on May 15 of that year and this showed the song as originally being scheduled for release on the album. It was slated to be released as the fourth track, though the shuffling of tracks between albums recorded by West led to the song being released on Ye instead. The song's follow-up was released by Kids See Ghosts on Kids See Ghosts under the title of "Freeee (Ghost Town, Pt. 2)" on June 8, 2018, also being led to by the shuffling.

In an interview with Pigeons & Planes, 070 Shake revealed that the song was finished hours before the album's listening party on May 31, 2018 and recalled reference tracks being recorded: "I had done a reference for it, and then I guess he forgot about it. We put that reference on another song, then Kanye did his own reference for that 'free' concept." She explained in the interview that it came close to not making the album's final cut during the recording sessions: "At the end we were talking and asking, 'Is this the one right here?' And I kind of mentioned 'Ghost Town' and said maybe we could use something from that." 070 Shake elaborated, revealing that after listening to the reference again, West "said, 'Oh yeah, this is the one.'" She concluded, stating: "So 'Ghost Town' almost didn't make it." According to 070 Shake, she wrote the reference track after first arriving in Wyoming and West had forgot about it due to him being "very focused on a lot of other things, other songs and stuff , and it just left his mind a little bit." Recording for Ye had started after West made controversial comments about slavery in a TMZ interview earlier in May 2018 that led to the album being re-done afterwards.

Critical reception
"Ghost Town" was met with generally strong reviews from music critics, often being ranked as one of the album's highlights. Meaghan Garvey of Pitchfork pointed to the track as "yes clear highlight," while she regarded the outro by 070 Shake and Kid Cudi's refrain as being better than West's verse, specially noting that 070 Shake's "performance is unexpectedly magnetic." Carrie Battan from The New Yorker named the track as the best song, pointing out its elements of soul and pop punk, though viewed the track as "the finest example of hip-hop's current fascination with rock music" and praised the outro by 070 Shake for showing that her "androgynous, pubescent voice is used to create a bridge between the joyous and the morbid." Outside of "I Thought About Killing You" and "Yikes", The Independents Christopher Hooton billed the track as the album's "only other remotely good song." Hooton continued, viewing it as being salvaged by 070 Shake "with a stunning, anthemic and sincere vocal over a crunchy guitar riff." Rob Sheffield of Rolling Stone complemented the song for being the only track on Ye that "stands on its own" and also directed praise towards 070 Shake's vocals, though concluded by writing that the song has "genuine heart – enough heart to make you wish Kanye could find a way out of his current creative trap." Douglas Greenwood from NME described the song as the album's "penultimate and perhaps strongest track" and argued that it "owes a great deal to its euphoric, rocky outro" from 070 Shake, with him viewing the outro as "a moment of real clarity on a record that's immediately impactful." Writing for Entertainment Weekly, Alex Suskind highlighted the song as one of Yes "few bright spots," commenting that it "resembles My Beautiful Dark Twisted Fantasy opus 'Runaway'" and Suskind directed praise towards the lyrical content. Adam Rothbarth of Tiny Mix Tapes commented with praise for Kid Cudi's "purposely gnarly" refrain, West's "elegant vocal performance" and the production of the song. However, Rothbarth opined that the production "sets the perfect foundation for 070 Shake's cyclical" outro and cited the outro as one of the highlights of Ye.

Clayton Purdom from The A.V. Club stated that "Ghost Town" "holds up the entire album" and labeled the song as "a staggeringly dense sound collage that sounds like a wide-open Wyoming night sky coming alive with dreamy laser blasts." The Irish Times Ed Power referred to the song as "gorgeous and uncomplicated." Trent Clark from HipHopDX pointed towards the "passionate cameo" from 070 Shake on the song as what "unveils a star-in-the-making." Greg Kot of the Chicago Tribune said that it shows "West telegraphing his vulnerability through shaky singing," despite concluding that 070 Shake "walks away with the song." AllMusic writer Neil Z. Yeung asserted that the song shines as one of the album's "moments of clarity" and commended the lyrical content. For the Los Angeles Times, Mikael Wood viewed West and 070 Shake's singing as "just astounding" and cited the latter's outro as "a star-making cameo," while also noting the clarity displayed by 070 Shake. Zachary Hoskins was less enthusiastic in Slant Magazine, dismissing West's verse despite naming the song as the most polished track on Ye and positively writing of the guitar, as well as Kid Cudi's vocals. In a negative review for The Line of Best Fit, Ross Horton panned the singing on the song and called it "the kind of thing that you once could, objectively, understand to be joke," with the loudness of the vocals receiving criticism from him. Similarly, Steve 'Flash' Juon of RapReviews complained that having to listen to West's singing on the song makes him "just like 'Whyyyyyyy?'" Juon insisted that his opinion of West lacking in singing ability bared no relevance to any dislike towards him, as Juon admitted that Chris Brown can sing despite not liking him either.

Accolades
Vulture named "Ghost Town" as one of the best new songs for the week of June 7, 2018. Hunter Harris of the site labelled the track as "a mediocre album's best offering," though directed praise towards 070 Shake's outro. It was listed as one of the best songs from the first half of the year by Junkee, with Lauren Ziegler calling the track "a therapy session." Refinery29 named it to their list of 2018's best summer songs, published in June of that year. On uDiscoverMusics November 2019 list of West's best samples, the Royal Jesters sample on the track was ranked 20th. For the website, Paul Bowler wrote that the sample is where West "returns to the soulful grooves with which he made his name" and viewed it as "powering" West's performance on "Ghost Town".

The track appeared on year-end lists by multiple publications, including being listed as the fifth best song of 2018 by Consequence of Sound. Matt Melis of the publication complimented it as the "very best" of West's 2018 and Melis described the track as where West is "backed by a killer, old-school sample; surrounded by friends; and delivering a liberating, back-to-basics message." Joe ranked "Ghost Town" at the same position on their list, with Dave Hanratty calling it "an exceptional song that hit the heavens with power and grace." The track was named by The Daily Beast as the seventh best song of 2018 and Marlow Stern called it West's most impressive work from that year, while he praised 070 Shake's outro that accordingly "soars to the stratosphere."

Commercial performance
Following the release of Ye, "Ghost Town" debuted on the US Billboard Hot 100 at number 16, standing as the highest charting non-single from the album. The song entered the US Streaming Songs chart at number eight, with 29.7 million streams. On the US Hot R&B/Hip-Hop Songs chart, it opened at number 11. By debuting at number two on the US Hot R&B Songs chart, the song stood as the only track from the album to enter to chart. The next week, following the release of Kids See Ghosts, the song descended 44 places to number 60 on the Hot 100, though was two places higher on the chart than "Freeee (Ghost Town, Pt. 2)" that week. The song was certified platinum by the Recording Industry Association of America (RIAA) for selling 1,000,000 certified units in the United States on September 23, 2020. For 2018, "Ghost Town" ranked at number 42 on the year-end US Hot R&B Songs chart.

The track performed best in New Zealand, peaking at number 14 on the NZ Singles Chart. Similarly, the track debuted on the UK Singles Chart at number 17, giving West his third top 40 entry on the chart issue that fell on the date of his 41st birthday. The track reached number 21 on the Canadian Hot 100. On the ARIA Singles Chart, it debuted at number 22 and came close to giving West his third top 20 entry for that week. The track also reached the top 30 in Slovakia, Greece, Ireland and Portugal. In Estonia, the song entered at number 37 on the Singlid tipp-40. The following week, it rose five places to number 32 on the chart. The track experienced lesser performance in the Czech Republic, reaching number 42 on the country's Singles Digitál Top 100 chart.

Live performances

070 Shake performed solely her part on the song live on June 22, 2018 for her set at Ladyland Fest in Brooklyn. The performance generated a positive reaction from the crowd and they were able to recall the words to 070 Shake's part, though it marked the first time that any portion of the song had been performed live. On August 16, 2018, West and Kid Cudi delivered a performance of a rendition of it live at a surprise show in the Los Angeles nightclub Los Candiles, as part of a private party in celebration of West's Yeezy Season 4 collaborator Willo Perron. A small room was covered in red light for the performance and the crowd joined in when the rappers shouted lyrics from the song, while this marked the first time that West had performed it live. The track was performed live by West, Kid Cudi and 070 Shake on the outro of the 44th season premier of Saturday Night Live (SNL) in September 2018, with them being accompanied by a backing band. However, the performance was cut off around the time that 070 Shake began to deliver her part of it and the song was followed by a speech from West about his support of the US president Donald Trump. Prior to West's appearance, SNL creator Lorne Michaels revealed in an interview on the Origins With James Andrew Miller podcast that West was booked for the show when he stepped up after singer Ariana Grande dropped out. For West and Kid Cudi's first performance billed as Kids See Ghosts, the duo performed the song live as the closer to their set at the 2018 Camp Flog Gnaw Carnival.

West was joined by Kid Cudi and 070 Shake when leading his gospel group the Sunday Service Choir through a rendition of it at their first concert on January 7, 2019. Later that month, the Sunday Service Choir collaborated with West for a rendition of the song as part of a concert from the group. The performance began once West got up off a stool 36 minutes in to the concert, with the rendition including an extended outro that saw him deliver a sermon. During the sermon, West said "Don't it feel to know you can never be canceled. They say, 'You can't do this. You can't do that, you'll lose your career,' but I'm still here." Kid Cudi brought out West as a surprise during the start of his weekend two set at the 2019 Coachella Music Festival, where the two performed a rendition of "Ghost Town".

Appearances in media
Following the release of Ye, the song became a popular topic with fans of West across Twitter. Avenged Sevenfold member M. Shadows' published a list of his favourite tracks from 2018, which included "Ghost Town" on it. At a fashion show of Virgil Abloh during 2018 Paris Fashion Week, Canadian instrumental music group BadBadNotGood performed a cover version of the song. During the show, West and Kid Cudi were both in attendance. The laser sounds from the song resurfaced on singer Teyana Taylor's track "Issues/Hold On", which was produced by West and released on K.T.S.E. in June 2018. The song was covered by English soul musical collective Jungle on September 12, 2018, during a BBC Radio 1 Session.

Sequel

On June 8, 2018, the sequel to "Ghost Town", "Freeee (Ghost Town, Pt. 2)", was released as the fourth track on Kids See Ghosts. Originally, the prequel was slated for release on it from this position, while the sequel had not been slated for inclusion initially. Prior to the album's release, Revolt TV writer Ralph Bristout stated that the song managed to "set up the excitement for" it. The titles of the album and the sequel, respectively, are part of a "spooky-ghost routine." The routine is continued from "Ghost Town" being titled as such, while Kids See Ghosts track "4th Dimension" is also linked to the song, since they both sample Ann Lee's "Someday". Kids See Ghosts are the lead performers of the sequel, differing from the prequel, on which Kid Cudi is an additional vocalist and West is the lead performer. The sequel includes vocals from American musician Ty Dolla Sign. The song also interpolates lyrics from the prequel.

The song was less successful than the prequel on the Hot 100, debuting at number 62 on the chart. During Kid Cudi's appearance at Coachella 2019, he brought out West as a surprise. The two of them performed "Ghost Town" and the song, alongside other collaborations. The staff of NME reassembled Ye and Kids See Ghosts for an edited album entitled Ye Sees Ghosts, featuring the prequel leading into the sequel.

Credits and personnel
Recording 
 Recorded at West Lake Ranch, Jackson Hole, Wyoming

Personnel

 Kanye West production, songwriter
 Mike Dean co-production, songwriter, engineering, mixing
 Noah Goldstein additional production, songwriter, recording engineering
 Francis and the Lights additional production
 Benny Blanco additional production
 070 Shake songwriter, vocals
 PartyNextDoor songwriter, vocals
 Carole Bayer Sager songwriter
 Carmen Reece songwriter
 Cydel Young songwriter
 Dexter Mills songwriter
 Francis Starlite songwriter
 Jordan Thorpe songwriter
 Kenneth Pershon songwriter
 Malik Yusef songwriter
 Shirley Ann Lee songwriter
 Terrence Boykin songwriter
 Trade Martin songwriter
 Mike Malchicoff engineering
 Zack Djurich engineering
 Mauricio Iragorri recording engineering
 Jess Jackson mixing
 Kid Cudi vocals

Credits adapted from Tidal.

Charts

Weekly charts

Year-end charts

Certifications

See also
 2018 in hip hop music

Notes

References

2018 songs
Kanye West songs
070 Shake songs
Song recordings produced by Benny Blanco
Song recordings produced by Kanye West
Song recordings produced by Mike Dean (record producer)
Songs written by 070 Shake
Songs written by Carole Bayer Sager
Songs written by Cyhi the Prynce
Songs written by Consequence (rapper)
Songs written by Kanye West
Songs written by Malik Yusef
Songs written by Mike Dean (record producer)
Songs written by Pardison Fontaine
Songs written by PartyNextDoor